"Do You Always (Have to Be Alone)?" is a song by Swedish musician Bo Martin Erik Erikson, known under the pseudonym of E-Type. The ballad was one of the last singles from his debut album, Made in Sweden (1994), and was produced by Max Martin. It features vocals by singer Nana Hedin and became a top 20 hit in Sweden, where it reached number 13. No music video was made for the single.

Track listing
 CD maxi, Europe (1995)
"Do You Always (Have to Be Alone)?" (Radio Edit) – 4:19
"Do You Always (Have to Be Alone)?" (Floating Version) – 3:58
"This Is the Way Too" (Unplugged) – 3:57

Charts

References

 

1995 singles
1995 songs
1990s ballads
Pop ballads
E-Type (musician) songs
Nana Hedin songs
Song recordings produced by Max Martin
Stockholm Records singles
English-language Swedish songs